The 206th Tactical Fighter Squadron was a squadron of the 7th Air Wing of the Japan Air Self-Defense Force. It was based at Hyakuri Air Base, in Ibaraki Prefecture, Japan. It was equipped with Lockheed F-104J/DJ aircraft. It was replaced by the Mitsubishi F-15J-equipped 306th Tactical Fighter Squadron.

Tail marking
The squadron's tail marking was a plum blossom. The 305th Tactical Fighter Squadron continued the tradition by also using a plum blossom design on the tails of its aircraft.

Aircraft operated

Fighter aircraft
 Lockheed F-104J/DJ (1965-1978)

See also
 Fighter units of the Japan Air Self-Defense Force

References

Units of the Japan Air Self-Defense Force